This list of mountains shows a selection of the highest and best-known peaks in the Ore Mountains (German: Erzgebirge, Czech: Krušné hory) of Central Europe (in order of elevation):

 Klínovec (Keilberg), 1,244 m, highest peak in the Ore Mountains
 Fichtelberg, 1,215 m, highest peak in Saxony   
 Božídarský Špičák (Gottesgaber Spitzberg), 1,115 m   
 Meluzína (Wirbelstein), 1,094 m   
 Blatenský vrch (Plattenberg), 1,043 m   
 Eisenberg, 1,028 m   
 Plešivec (Pleßberg), 1,028 m   
 Auersberg, 1,019 m   
 Taufichtig, 1,001 m   
 Jelení hora (Haßberg), 993 m   
 Tisovský vrch, 976 m   
 Velký Špičák (Großer Spitzberg or Schmiedeberger Spitzberg), 965 m   
 Brückenberg, 964 m   
 Loučná (Wieselstein), 956 m, highest peak in the Eastern Ore Mountains   
 Aschberg, 936 m   
 Rehhübel, 932 m   
 Medvědí skála (Bernsteinberg), 924 m   
 Riesenberg, 923 m   
 Lesenská pláň (Hübladung), 921 m   
 Na strašidlech, 913 m   
 Rabenberg, 913 m   
 Lesná (mountain) (Ladung), 911 m   
 Mědník (Kupferhübel), 910 m   
 Pramenáč (Bornhauberg), 909 m  
 Kahleberg, 905 m, highest elevation in the Saxon part of the Eastern Ore Mountains
 Bärenstein, 898 m, basalt table mountain
 Fastenberg, 891 m   
 Hirtstein, 888 m   
 Leistnerhübel, 879 m   
 Bouřňák (Stürmer), 869 m   
 Stropník, 856 m
 Čihadlo, 842 m
 Ochsenkopf bei Rittersgrün, 836 m   
 Pöhlberg, 832 m, Basalt-Tafelberg   
 Geisingberg, 824 m   
 Ochsenkopf bei Jägerhaus, 823 m   
 Steinhübel, 817 m   
 Morgenleithe, 811 m   
 Komáří hůrka (Mückenberg), 808 m, widely known as the Mückentürmchen   
 Scheibenberg, 807 m, basalt table mountain
 Drachenkopf bei Nassau, 805 m   
 Olověný vrch, 802 m   
 Sauberg, 797 m   
 Kuhberg, 795 m   
 Schwartenberg, 789 m   
 Kohlhaukuppe, 786 m   
 Adlerfels, 778 m   
 Schatzenstein, 760 m   
 Greifensteine, 731 m   
 Spiegelwald, 728 m   
 Špičák (Sattelberg), 723 m   
 Nakléřovská výšina, 703 m
Roter Burg 668 m
 Adlerstein, 676 m
 Hirschenstein (Saxony), 610.4 m

See also
 List of mountains in Saxony

!Mountains
Ore Mountains